The 1984–85 SM-liiga season was the tenth season of the SM-liiga, the top level of ice hockey in Finland. 10 teams participated in the league, and Ilves Tampere won the championship.

Standings

Playoffs

Semifinal
 TPS - Ässät 3:2 (2:7, 2:4, 6:1, 3:2, 5:2)
 Ilves - Kärpät 3:1 (2:4, 3:2, 5:2, 5:3)

3rd place
 Kärpät - Ässät 2:1 (7:2, 3:4, 4:1)

Final
 TPS - Ilves 2:3 (3:2, 6:1, 1:8, 2:3, 2:3)

Relegation

External links
 SM-liiga official website

1984–85 in Finnish ice hockey
Fin
Liiga seasons